Gabriela, is a Mexican telenovela that aired on  Canal 4, Telesistema Mexicano in 1960.

Plot 
Gabriela is a young girl, who for love cheats on her husband.

Cast 
 María Teresa Rivas as Gabriela
 Roberto Cañedo
 Angelines Fernández

References

External links 
 Gabriela a imdb (en inglés)

1960 telenovelas
Mexican telenovelas
Televisa telenovelas
Television shows set in Mexico City
1960 Mexican television series debuts
1960 Mexican television series endings
Spanish-language telenovelas